Trichlorophenylsilane is a compound with formula Si(C6H5)Cl3.

Similarly to other alkylchlorosilanes, trichlorophenylsilane is a possible precursor to silicone. It hydrolyses in water to give HCl and phenylsilantriol, with the latter condensating to a polymeric substance.

See also 

 Methyltrichlorosilane

Chlorosilanes
Phenyl compounds